Darrynton L.A. Evans (born July 9, 1998) is an American football running back and return specialist of the National Football League (NFL). He played college football at Appalachian State. He was drafted by the Tennessee Titans in the third round of the 2020 NFL Draft.

Early life and high school career
Evans attended New Smyrna Beach High School in New Smyrna, Florida. He committed to Appalachian State University to play college football.

College career
As a true freshman at Appalachian State in 2016, Evans played in 12 games rushing for 217 yards on 48 carries. He also returned 25 kicks for 563 yards and a touchdown. Evans missed 2017 due to injury and redshirted. Returning from the injury in 2018, he entered the season as a backup to Jalin Moore but took over as the starter after Moore was injured for the season, and rushed for 1,187 yards on 179 carries and seven touchdowns. As a kick returner he had 490 yards on 15 returns and had a touchdown. He was named the MVP of the 2018 Sun Belt Conference Football Championship Game after totaling 218 total yards. As a full-time starter in 2019, Evans was the Sun Belt Conference Offensive Player of the Year after rushing for 1,480 yards with 2,064 all purpose yards and 24 total touchdowns. He was also named MVP of the 2019 Sun Belt Conference Football Championship Game and 2019 New Orleans Bowl. After the season, he decided to forgo his senior season and enter the 2020 NFL Draft.

Professional career

Tennessee Titans
Evans was selected by the Tennessee Titans with the 93rd overall pick in the third round of the 2020 NFL Draft.

He was placed on injured reserve on October 15, 2020, with a hamstring injury. He was activated on December 7, 2020. In Week 15 against the Detroit Lions, Evans recorded 57 yards from scrimmage and a receiving touchdown during the 46–25 win. This was Evans' first career touchdown.

Evans finished the 2020 season playing in five games with 14 rushes for 54 yards, two receptions for 27 yards and a receiving touchdown, and nine kickoff returns for 206 yards as a backup to rushing yards and touchdowns leader Derrick Henry. He recorded one carry for one yard in the Titans' 20–13 loss to the Baltimore Ravens in the wildcard round of the playoffs.

On September 2, 2021, Evans was placed on injured reserve. He was activated on October 23. On October 29, 2021 he was placed back on injured reserve for a second time ending his season.

On March 10, 2022, Evans was waived by the Titans.

Chicago Bears
On March 11, 2022, Evans was claimed off waivers by the Chicago Bears. He was waived on August 30, 2022 and signed to the practice squad the next day. He was promoted to the active roster on November 27.

Personal life
Evans is a Christian. Evans is married to Aiyana Willoughby. He runs a YouTube and Twitch channel called ItzLiveee.

References

External links
Appalachian State Mountaineers bio
Tennessee Titans bio

1998 births
Living people
Players of American football from Florida
Sportspeople from Volusia County, Florida
American football running backs
Appalachian State Mountaineers football players
Tennessee Titans players
Chicago Bears players